Detroit Wheels were a United States soccer team based in Detroit, Michigan, that played in the USISL for two seasons. Owned by Antonio Soave and Greg Reynolds, the team was established in 1994.  At the time the ownership intended to move up to the American Professional Soccer League for the 1995 season.  However, mounting debts and a smaller than expected fan base saw them remain in the USISL. Wheels played the 1994 season in Wisner Stadium and were coached first by Mark Christenson and then by Mike Francis. The team was captained by Steve Burns, the current men's head soccer coach of the University of Michigan.  The team was replaced in the USISL in 1996 by Detroit Dynamite.

Year-by-year

References

Defunct soccer clubs in Michigan
W
USISL teams
Soccer clubs in Michigan
1994 establishments in Michigan
1995 disestablishments in Michigan
Association football clubs established in 1994
Association football clubs disestablished in 1995